Shingo Kunieda defeated the two-time defending champion Robin Ammerlaan in the final, 6–2, 6–2 to win the men's singles wheelchair tennis title at the 2007 US Open. It was his first US Open singles title and third major singles title overall.

Seeds

 Shingo Kunieda (champion)
 Robin Ammerlaan (final)

Draw

Finals

External links
Draw
PDF Draw

Wheelchair Men's Singles
U.S. Open, 2007 Men's Singles